Aranean was an old district of Armenia  400–800.

See also
List of regions of ancient Armenia

Early medieval Armenian regions